Choice Language is the ninth studio album by folk rock band Capercaillie. The promo CD was issued in a cardboard sleeve with a different track listing and one alternate song title that differed from the final release ("Homer's Reel" vs "Mooney's").

Final track listing
 "Mile Marbhaisg Air A Ghaol (A Thousand Curses On Love)" - 4:34
 "Homer's Reel" - 3:53
 "The Old Crone (Port Na Caillich)" - 3:45
 "Little Do They Know" - 5:28
 "At Dawn of Day" - 5:11
"Air Fair An La (At Dawn of Day)"
"Cailleach Liath Rathasai (Grey-haired Woman from Raasay)"
 "The Boy Who" - 4:31
 "The Sound of Sleat" - 4:29
"The Sound of Sleat"
"The Fear"
"Dans Plinn"
 "Nuair a Chì Thu Caileag Bhòidheach (When You See a Pretty Girl)" - 4:58
 "Who Will Raise Their Voice?" - 4:48
 "(I am in) A State of Yearning (Tha Fadachd Om Fhin)" - 4:41
 "Sort of Slides" - 5:14
"Choice Language"
"Bring Out the Will"
"Come Ahead Charlie"
 "I Will Set My Ship in Order" - 6:04

Promo track listing
 "Mìle Marbhaisg (A Thousand Curses)" - 4:34
 "Mooney's" - 3:53
 "The Boy Who" - 4:31
 "A State of Yearning" - 4:41
 "Little Do They Know" - 5:28
 "The Old Crone (Port Na Caillich)" - 3:45 
 "Sound of Sleat" - 4:29
 "Who Will Raise Their Voice" - 4:48
 "Nuair a Chì Thu Caileag Bhòidheach" - 4:58
 "At Dawn of Day" - 5:11
 "Sort of Slides" - 5:14
 "I Will Set My Ship in Order" - 6:04

References

Capercaillie (band) albums
2002 albums
Scottish Gaelic music